Mulla Abdulkarim Sipandi Samarqandi (1829–1909) was a Tajik bilingual poet. He lived in Samarkand, in current-day Uzbekistan. His work consists of ghazal, qit'a, mukhammas, and ruba'i, which were written in the Tajik language. Samarkandi also wrote Hajvi kali Ibrahim.

Example of Sipandi's poetry

Ghazal of Sipand in Tajik language:

Шаб ки он дилбар маро бо хештан дамсоз кард,
Чашми шухи у ба андози ниёзам ноз кард.
Богбони хусн сарви комати нози туро
Дар миёни навнихолони чаман мумтоз кард.
Дар харими базми васлат рухсати наззора нест,
Гар ба руйи мехр натвон чашми хайрат боз кард.
Аз шикасти согари дил нолае омад ба гуш,
Чинии Фагфур хам натвонад ин овоз кард.
Дар дами хам аз чаври фалак гофил мабош,
Боз дар анчом созад он чи дар анчом кард.
Бахри у худро Сипанди сухтам чандон ки чарх,
Сад хазор оина аз хокистарам пардоз кард.

English translation:

Last night that beautiful was with me.
Her naughty eyes were gazing to my needs.
A gardener of a cypress of your gracious height.
Among newly planted trees makes it elite.
In feast of intimacy there is no need of asking to see.
If you cannot open your surprised eyes to the kind face.
From the broken love cup of the heart weeping comes to ears.
Chinese Fagfur even cannot give this way to make himself heard.
In breathing from oppression of heaven do not be careless.
Again in conclusion builds that what in conclusion did.
For her benefit Sipandi did not spare himself so much.
Thousands of looking glasses beauty treat with my ashes.

References 

1829 births
1909 deaths
Tajikistani male writers
Tajik poets
19th-century poets